Franklin Township is a township in Gloucester County, in the U.S. state of New Jersey. As of the 2020 United States census, the township's population was 16,380, a decrease of 440 (−2.6%) from the 2010 census count of 16,820, which in turn reflected an increase of 1,354 (+8.8%) from the 15,466 counted in the 2000 census.

Franklin Township was formed as a township by an act of the New Jersey Legislature on January 27, 1820, from portions of Greenwich Township and Woolwich Township. Parts of the township have been taken to form Clayton Township (February 5, 1858) and Newfield (March 8, 1924). The township was named for Benjamin Franklin.

Geography
According to the U.S. Census Bureau, the township had a total area of 56.39 square miles (146.04 km2), including 55.83 square miles (144.60 km2) of land and 0.56 square miles (1.44 km2) of water (0.99%). Unincorporated communities, localities and place names located partially or completely within the township include Blue Bell, Downstown, Forest Grove. Franklinville, Fries Mills, Iona, Janvier, Lake, Malaga, Marsh Lake, Piney Hollow, Plainville, Star Cross, and Porchtown.

The township borders the municipalities of Clayton, Elk Township, Monroe Township, and Newfield in Gloucester County; Buena and Buena Vista Township in Atlantic County; Vineland in Cumberland County; and Pittsgrove Township and Upper Pittsgrove Township in Salem County.

Demographics

2010 census

The Census Bureau's 2006–2010 American Community Survey showed that, in 2010 inflation-adjusted dollars, median household income was $74,327 with a margin of error of +/− $6,247, and median family income was $80,667 (+/− $7,344). Males had a median income of $51,425 (+/− $3,105) versus $42,297 (+/− $2,605) for females. The per capita income for Franklin Township was $32,141 (+/− $3,019). About 4.7% of families and 7.0% of the population were below the poverty line, including 6.9% of those under age 18 and 15.2% of those age 65 or over.

2000 census
As of the 2000 U.S. census there were 15,466 people, 5,225 households, and 4,190 families residing in the township. The racial makeup of the township was 90.22% White, 6.66% African American, 0.31% Native American, 0.41% Asian, 0.01% Pacific Islander, 1.25% from other races, and 1.14% from two or more races. Hispanic or Latino of any race were 3.51% of the population.

There were 5,225 households, out of which 40.4% had children under the age of 18 living with them, 63.9% were married couples living together, 11.2% had a female householder with no husband present, and 19.8% were non-families. 15.9% of all households were made up of individuals, and 5.4% had someone living alone who was 65 years of age or older.  The average household size was 2.94 and the average family size was 3.29.

In the township, the population was spread out, with 27.7% under the age of 18, 8.5% from 18 to 24, 30.8% from 25 to 44, 23.5% from 45 to 64, and 9.6% who were 65 years of age or older.  The median age was 36 years. For every 100 females, there were 99.7 males.  For every 100 females age 18 and over, there were 97.7 males.

The median income for a household in the township was $55,169, and the median income for a family was $60,518. Males had a median income of $41,159 versus $27,538 for females. The per capita income for the township was $20,277.  About 3.5% of families and 5.1% of the population were below the poverty line, including 3.8% of those under age 18 and 6.4% of those age 65 or over.

Government

Local government 
Franklin Township is governed under the Township form of New Jersey municipal government, one of 141 municipalities (of the 564) statewide that use this form, the second-most commonly used form of government in the state. The Township Committee is comprised of five members, who are elected directly by the voters at-large in partisan elections to serve three-year terms of office on a staggered basis, with either one or two seats coming up for election each year as part of the November general election in a three-year cycle. At an annual reorganization meeting, the Township Committee selects one of its members to serve as Mayor and another as Deputy Mayor.

, the Franklin Township Committee is comprised of Mayor John "Jake" Bruno (R, term on committee ends December 31, 2024; term as mayor ends 2022), Deputy Mayor David P. Deegan Jr. (R, term on committee and as deputy mayor ends 2022), Timothy Doyle (R, 2023), Heather Flaim (R, 2023) and Mary Petsch-Wilson (R, 2022).

In January 2020, Timothy Doyle was chosen from three candidates nominated by the Republican municipal committee to fill the seat expiring in December 2020 that had been held by Leah Vasallo until she resigned from office the previous month.

Republican Heather Flaim was appointed to fill the seat expiring in December 2018 that became vacant following the death of Ed Leopardi in September 2016; a judge ruled in May 2017 that Flaim could take the seat in a ruling in a case in which the local Democratic municipal committee claimed that it had submitted a list of three candidates to succeed Leopardi, which the township claims it never received. Flaim won a full three-year term in the November 2017 general election, while Democrat Charles F. Pluta was elected to serve the balance of Leopardi's term of office.

Federal, state and county representation 
Franklin Township is located in the 2nd Congressional District and is part of New Jersey's 3rd state legislative district. Prior to the 2011 reapportionment following the 2010 Census, Franklin Township had been in the 4th state legislative district.

Politics 
As of March 2011, there were a total of 10,760 registered voters in Franklin, of which 2,885 (26.8%) were registered as Democrats, 2,422 (22.5%) were registered as Republicans and 5,444 (50.6%) were registered as Unaffiliated. There were 9 voters registered as Libertarians or Greens.

In the 2020 presidential election, Republican Donald Trump received 61.0% of the vote (5,947 cast), ahead of Democrat Joe Biden with 37.4% (3,644 votes), and other candidates with 1.2% (149 votes) among the 9,740 ballots cast by the township's 12,573 registered voters, for a turnout of 77.4%.

In the 2016 presidential election, Republican Donald Trump received 58.8% of the vote (4,631 cast), ahead of Democrat Hillary Clinton with 37.4% (2,646 votes), and other candidates with 3.8% (591 votes) among the 7,868 ballots cast by the township's 11,750 registered voters, for a turnout of 67.0%.

In the 2012 presidential election, Democrat Barack Obama received 50.9% of the vote (3,782 cast), ahead of Republican Mitt Romney with 47.8% (3,553 votes), and other candidates with 1.4% (101 votes), among the 7,492 ballots cast by the township's 11,180 registered voters (56 ballots were spoiled), for a turnout of 67.0%. 

In the 2008 presidential election, Democrat Barack Obama received 51.3% of the vote (4,065 cast), ahead of Republican John McCain with 46.0% (3,646 votes) and other candidates with 1.7% (131 votes), among the 7,923 ballots cast by the township's 11,085 registered voters, for a turnout of 71.5%. 

In the 2004 presidential election, Republican George W. Bush received 49.5% of the vote (3,503 ballots cast), outpolling Democrat John Kerry with 48.7% (3,443 votes) and other candidates with 0.9% (92 votes), among the 7,073 ballots cast by the township's 9,870 registered voters, for a turnout percentage of 71.7.

In the 2013 gubernatorial election, Republican Chris Christie received 62.2% of the vote (1,138 cast), ahead of Democrat Barbara Buono with 37.0% (677 votes), and other candidates with 0.8% (14 votes), among the 1,915 ballots cast by the township's 3,654 registered voters (86 ballots were spoiled), for a turnout of 52.4%. In the 2009 gubernatorial election, Republican Chris Christie received 49.2% of the vote (2,445 ballots cast), ahead of Democrat Jon Corzine with 40.2% (1,998 votes), Independent Chris Daggett with 8.4% (417 votes) and other candidates with 0.7% (35 votes), among the 4,969 ballots cast by the township's 11,042 registered voters, yielding a 45.0% turnout.

Public safety 
Franklin Township is served by the Franklin Township Police Department, along with five volunteer fire companies and the County-run Emergency Medical Services. Serving are Forest Grove Volunteer Fire Company (founded 1949), Franklinville Volunteer Fire Company, Janvier Volunteer Fire Company (founded 1946), Malaga Volunteer Fire Company, Star Cross Volunteer Fire Company. Since 2017, Gloucester County EMS provides emergency medical services for the whole township, after the governing body questioned the ability of the Township of Franklin Ambulance Corps to respond to calls with volunteers.

Education 
Franklin Township Public Schools serve students in pre-kindergarten through sixth grade. As of the 2018–19 school year, the district, comprised of three schools, had an enrollment of 1,408 students and 114.0 classroom teachers (on an FTE basis), for a student–teacher ratio of 12.4:1. Schools in the district (with 2018–19 enrollment data from the National Center for Education Statistics) are 
Mary F. Janvier Elementary School with 597 students in grades K–2, 
Main Road School with 394 students in grades 3–4 and Caroline L. Reutter School with 406 students in grades 5–6. Students from Newfield attend the Franklin Township district's schools as part of a sending/receiving relationship in which Newfield accounts for about 100 of the nearly 1,400 students in the district.

For seventh through twelfth grades, students attend the Delsea Regional School District, which serves students from both Elk Township and Franklin Township. Students from Newfield attend the district as part of a sending/receiving relationship begun in September 2010 after Newfield ended its prior relationship with the Buena Regional School District. As of the 2018–2019 school year, the regional high school district, comprised of two schools, had an enrollment of 1,661 students and 123.8 classroom teachers (on an FTE basis), for a student–teacher ratio of 13.4:1. Schools in the district (with 2018–2019 enrollment data from the National Center for Education Statistics) are 
Delsea Regional Middle School with 563 students in grades 7 and 8, and 
Delsea Regional High School with 1,047 students in grades 9–12. The seats on the high school district's nine-member board of education are allocated to the constituent municipalities based on population, with seven seats assigned to Franklin Township.

The New Jersey Department of Education considered a vote by the Franklin Township Board of Education in June 2010 requesting that the district withdraw from the Delsea Regional School District, which would require that the Delsea region be dissolved as about 80% of the regional district's students come from Franklin. With the withdrawal of Franklin Township, two options being considered were to either have Franklin and Elk Townships create a new regional district with Newfield students attending on a send-receive basis, or having Franklin Township establish its own Pre-K–12 district which would receive students from both Elk Township and Newfield.

Students from across the county are eligible to apply to attend Gloucester County Institute of Technology, a four-year high school in Deptford Township that provides technical and vocational education. As a public school, students do not pay tuition to attend the school.

The Roman Catholic Diocese of Camden operates St. Michael the Archangel Regional School in Clayton; Nativity Church in Franklinville is one of the sending parishes. Our Lady of Mercy Academy is a college preparatory, all-girls Catholic high school founded in 1962 by the Daughters of Our Lady of Mercy.

Transportation

Roads and highways

U.S. Route 40 passes through the southern area while both Route 47 and the Route 55 pass through the eastern part of the township.

The county roads that pass through Franklin Township include CR 538, CR 555 and CR 557.

Public transportation
NJ Transit provides bus service in the township on service between Cape May and Philadelphia on the 313 and between Millville and Philadelphia on the 408 route.

Notable people

People who were born in, residents of, or otherwise closely associated with Franklin Township include:
 Domenick DiCicco (born 1963), politician who served in the New Jersey General Assembly from 2010 to 2012, where he represented the 4th Legislative District
 H. Jay Dinshah (1933–2000), founder and president of the American Vegan Society and editor of its publication, Ahimsa magazine
 Ed Keegan (1939–2014), MLB pitcher who played for the Philadelphia Phillies and Kansas City Athletics
 Eliot Marshall (born 1980), retired mixed martial artist

Wineries
 Coda Rossa Winery located in the Franklinville section of the township.

References

External links

Franklin Township website
Franklin Township Public Schools

School Data for the Franklin Township Public Schools, National Center for Education Statistics
Delsea Regional School District

School Data for the Delsea Regional School District, National Center for Education Statistics
Franklin forum
Franklinville Fire Company

 
1820 establishments in New Jersey
Populated places established in 1820
Township form of New Jersey government
Townships in Gloucester County, New Jersey